The Maine Superior Court is the trial court of general jurisdiction in the Maine state court system.

All state jury trials are held in the Superior Court. The court is located in each of Maine's 16 counties (with two locations in Aroostook County).  The Court consists of 17 justices who all have statewide jurisdiction and travel to the different courthouses to hold court. Justices are nominated by the Governor and confirmed by the Maine Senate and are appointed to seven-year terms.

Chief Justices of the Maine Superior Court
The position of Chief Justice of the Maine Superior Court was authorized by the Maine Legislature, P.L. 1983, c. 269, § 7, to be effective on January 1, 1984.  The Chief Justice is designated by the Chief Justice of the Supreme Judicial Court to "serve at the pleasure and under the supervision of the Chief Justice of the Supreme Judicial Court and shall be responsible for the operation of the Superior Court." 4 MRSA §101-A.

Current justices

Active-retired justices of the Maine Superior Court:

Former justices

Statewide Superior Court established January 1, 1930; P.L. 1929, ch 141.  The Superior Court, with a location in each county, became the general jurisdiction trial court, replacing the Maine Supreme Court justices who traveled from county to county to sit in trial terms (Nisi Prius) in those counties without their own Superior Court.  The presiding justices from the Superior Courts in four counties (Androscoggin, Cumberland, Kennebec, and Penobscot) continued to serve on the statewide Superior Court.  The Supreme Judicial Court was reduced from eight justices to six justices as a result of vacancies.

See also
Courts of Maine

Reference list

External links
Maine Superior Court official web site

Maine state courts
Maine
Courts and tribunals with year of establishment missing